Letterform Archive is a non-profit museum and special collections library in San Francisco, California dedicated to collecting materials on the history of lettering, typography, printing, and graphic design. It is curated by graphic designer Rob Saunders, who founded the museum with his private collection of "books, periodicals, maquettes, posters, and other ephemera" in 2014. The museum opened in February 2015 with 15,000 items. It moved to a larger space in 2020. Visits can be scheduled by appointment.

The Archive presented the “Without Type: The Dynamism of Handmade Letters” exhibit with the San Francisco Center for the Book from January 22 to April 3, 2016.

Collection 
As of 2020, the Archive’s collection totals over 60,000 items. The Archive acquired the private collection of Dutch collector Jan Tholenaar in 2015. In 2016, the Archive acquired over 200 wood type prints from local printer and typographer Jack Stauffacher. Emigre Graphics also donated a large collection of their work, including interviews, printed sheets, posters, paste ups, ephemera, and the entire collection of Emigre magazine, that year.

The Archive launched their digital archive of nearly 1,500 works and 9,000 images to the general public in 2019.

Publishing 
The Archive publishes books about the material in its collection, including: the work of W. A. Dwiggins, as a full-length biography by Bruce Kennett in 2017; the work of Jennifer Morla, written and designed by Morla in 2019; and the prints of Jack Stauffacher, edited and designed by Chuck Byrne in 2020.

Education 
The Archive has an education program (previously in collaboration with Cooper Union) which includes Type West, a full-year certificate program in typeface design, workshops on lettering and typography, and a lecture series. 

The Archive often hosts workshops and lectures. They have previously hosted type workshops by typeface designer Sumner Stone and sign painting workshops by Better Letter Co.

References

External links

 Online Archive
 Free paper texture by Letterform Archive

Museums in San Francisco
Design museums
Printing museums in the United States
2014 establishments in California